This is a list of school districts in North Carolina, including public charter schools.  

In North Carolina, most public school districts are organized at the county level, with a few organized at the municipal level.

A
Alamance-Burlington School System
Alexander County Schools
Alleghany County Schools
Anson County Schools
Ashe County Schools
Asheboro City Schools
Asheville City Schools
Avery County Schools

B
Beaufort County Schools
Bertie County Schools
Bladen County Schools
Brunswick County Schools
Buncombe County Schools
Burke County Public Schools

C
Cabarrus County Schools
Caldwell County Schools
Camden County Schools
Carteret County Public Schools
Caswell County Schools
Catawba County Schools
Chapel Hill-Carrboro City Schools
Charlotte-Mecklenburg Schools
Chatham County Schools
Cherokee County School District
Clay County Schools
Cleveland County Schools
Clinton City Schools
Columbus County Schools
Craven County Schools
Cumberland County Schools
Currituck County Schools

D
Dare County Schools
Davidson County Schools
Davie County Schools
Duplin County Schools
Durham Public Schools

E
Edenton-Chowan Schools
Edgecombe County Public Schools
Elizabeth City-Pasquotank Public Schools
Elkin City Schools

F
Franklin County Schools

G
Gaston County Schools
Gates County Schools
Graham County Schools
Granville County Schools
Greene County Schools
Guilford County Schools

H
Halifax County Schools
Harnett County Schools
Haywood County Schools
Henderson County Public Schools
Hertford County Public Schools
Hickory City Schools
Hoke County Schools
Hyde County Schools

I
Iredell-Statesville Schools

J
Jackson County Schools
Johnston County Schools
Jones County Schools

K
Kannapolis City Schools

L
Lee County Schools
Lenoir County Schools
Lexington City Schools
Lincoln County Schools

M
Macon County Schools
Madison County Schools
Martin County Schools
McDowell County Schools
Mitchell County Schools
Montgomery County Schools
Moore County Schools
Mooresville Graded School District
Mount Airy City Schools

N
Nash County Public Schools
New Hanover County Schools
Newton-Conover City Schools
Northampton County Schools

O
Onslow County Schools
Orange County Schools

P
Pamlico County Schools
Pender County Schools
Perquimans County Schools
Person County Schools
Pitt County Schools
Polk County Schools
Public Schools of Robeson County

R
Randolph County Schools
Richmond County Schools
Roanoke Rapids Graded School District
Rockingham County Schools
Rowan-Salisbury School System
Rutherford County Schools

S
Sampson County Schools
Scotland County Schools
Stanly County Schools
Stokes County Schools
Surry County Schools
Swain County Schools

T
Thomasville City Schools
Transylvania County Schools
Tyrrell County Schools

U
Union County Public Schools

V
Vance County Public Schools

W
Wake County Public School System
Warren County Schools
Washington County Schools
Watauga County Schools
Wayne County Public Schools
Weldon City Schools
Whiteville City Schools
Winston-Salem/Forsyth County Schools
Wilkes County Schools
Wilson County Schools

Y
Yadkin County Schools
Yancey County Schools

See also
List of high schools in North Carolina

School districts in North Carolina
School districts
North Carolina